Pilar Partido is a partido in the northern part of Greater Buenos Aires in Buenos Aires Province, Argentina.

It has universities and schools.

Settlements

 Pilar
 Del Viso
 Presidente Derqui
 Fátima
 La Lonja
 Manuel Alberti
 Manzanares
 Villa Rosa
 Villa Astolfi 
 Zelaya.

Gallery

External links
 Pilar.com (Spanish)
 Map of Pilar (Spanish)

 
Partidos of Buenos Aires Province